Akgedik is a village in Tarsus district of Mersin Province, Turkey. The population of Akgedik is 1065  as of 2010. Cotton and grape are the two main crops of the village.

References

Villages in Tarsus District